Khafr Rural District is a rural district (dehestan) in Khafr County, Fars Province, Iran. At the 2006 census, its population was 8,359, in 2,136 families.  The rural district has 7 villages.

References 

Rural Districts of Fars Province
Jahrom County